Aklim is a town in Berkane Province, Oriental, Morocco. According to the 2004 census, it has a population of 8,969.

Nearby is one of the sites considered for the European Extremely Large Telescope (ELT).

Notable people 
Mohammed Chaouch - Former international footballer

References

Populated places in Berkane Province
Municipalities of Morocco